Timothy Leroy Lincecum (born June 15, 1984), nicknamed "The Freak", "The Franchise", "The Freaky Franchise" and "Big Time Timmy Jim", is an American former professional baseball pitcher. He played in Major League Baseball (MLB) for the San Francisco Giants (2007 to 2015) and Los Angeles Angels (2016). A two-time Cy Young Award winner, Lincecum helped the Giants win three World Series championships from 2010 through 2014.

A graduate of Liberty Senior High School in Renton, Washington, Lincecum played college baseball at the University of Washington, where he won the 2006 Golden Spikes Award. That year, Lincecum became the first Washington Husky to be selected in the first round of an MLB Draft when the San Francisco Giants selected him tenth overall.

He also appeared in four consecutive All-Star Games from 2008 through 2011 and pitched no-hitters in 2013 and 2014. Lincecum won World Series rings with the Giants in 2010, 2012, and 2014. After an injury-plagued 2015 season, he made nine starts for the Angels in 2016.

Lincecum is one of only three pitchers in Major League history to win multiple World Series championships, win multiple Cy Young Awards, throw multiple no-hitters, and earn multiple All-Star selections; the others are Justin Verlander and Hall of Famer Sandy Koufax.

Early life
Lincecum's mother, Rebecca Asis, is the daughter of Filipino immigrants. His father, Chris, worked at Boeing and is distantly related by marriage to actress Natalie Wood. When Tim was drafted, he held out for a larger signing bonus so his father could retire. From the age of four, Chris helped his son refine his pitching motion, filming his practices and games and analyzing the video. Lincecum attended Liberty Senior High School in the Issaquah School District, where he played two seasons of varsity baseball. As a senior, he was named the state's Player of the Year and led his school to the 2003 3A Kingco Athletic Conference title. Lincecum was selected by the Chicago Cubs in the 48th round (1,408th overall) of the 2003 Major League Baseball (MLB) draft, but he did not sign, opting to attend the University of Washington instead.

In both 2004 and 2006, Lincecum was named the Pac-10 Pitcher of the Year for the Washington Huskies. He was selected by the Cleveland Indians in the 42nd round (1,261st overall) upon re-entering the draft in 2005. Again, he did not sign, rejecting an offer including a $700,000 signing bonus. He finished 2006 with a 12–4 win–loss record and a 1.94 earned run average (ERA), 199 strikeouts, and three saves in  innings. He was the recipient of the 2006 Golden Spikes Award, which is awarded annually to the best amateur baseball player.

In 2005, Lincecum played collegiate summer baseball for the Harwich Mariners of the Cape Cod Baseball League. He was named a league all-star for Harwich, and posted a 2–2 record with a league-leading 0.69 ERA, striking out 68 batters in 39 innings.

Professional career

Draft and minor leagues
In 2006, Lincecum was drafted tenth overall by the San Francisco Giants, becoming the first player from the University of Washington to be taken in the first round. His $2.025 million signing bonus was, at the time, the most the organization had ever paid to any amateur player.

Lincecum made his professional debut in 2006 with the Salem-Keizer Volcanoes of the Single-A short season Northwest League. Going into 2007, he was ranked as the #11 prospect in baseball and the #1 prospect in the San Francisco Giants organization by Baseball America. In the spring of 2007, Colorado Rockies prospect Ian Stewart described Lincecum as tough to face, saying "You can’t see the ball at all until it’s right on top of you. It gets on you real quick...Guys on our club who have been in the big leagues said he’s the toughest guy they ever faced too." Lincecum spent the first month of the season pitching for the Fresno Grizzlies, the Giants' Triple-A affiliate in the Pacific Coast League (PCL). In 31 innings across five starts with the Grizzlies, he allowed just one run, 12 hits, and 11 walks while striking out 46 batters and going 4–0. During his 2006 and 2007 minor league campaigns, Lincecum struck out 30.9% of batters, the highest ratio of any minor league pitcher in the previous ten years.

San Francisco Giants (2007–2015)

Rookie year (2007)
After starter Russ Ortiz suffered an inflamed elbow, the Giants called Lincecum up to make his first major league start on May 6, 2007, against the Philadelphia Phillies. Lincecum struck out three batters in his first inning, the first being Chase Utley.

Lincecum earned his first major league win five days later against the Rockies. His next two starts were against the Houston Astros, on May 17 and 22. After the first match-up, Astros third baseman Mike Lamb said, "The stuff he was throwing out there tonight was everything he's hyped up to be. You just don't see that every day. He pitched very much like the pitcher he is compared to and out-dueled him throughout the night." After recording a no decision in the first game, Lincecum pitched eight innings and got the win the second time.

In July, Lincecum went 4–0 with a 1.62 ERA. On July 1, in a seven-inning performance against the Arizona Diamondbacks, he recorded 12 strikeouts and allowed just three hits in a 13–0 victory. Lincecum pitched into the ninth inning for the first time on August 21 against the Cubs, holding a 1–0 lead. He had allowed just two hits and one walk through the first eight, while throwing only 88 pitches. Cubs shortstop Ryan Theriot said after the game, "He's got electric stuff. The best stuff I've seen all year."

Lincecum was benched in September as a precaution due to the high number of innings he had pitched in his first full year of professional baseball. Between the minors and the majors, he pitched a total of  innings in the 2007 season.

Consecutive Cy Young Awards (2008–2009)
The Giants asked Lincecum not to throw bullpen sessions like the ones other pitchers typically throw during the off-season. Bruce Bochy, the manager of the Giants, told the San Francisco Chronicle that the team was being careful with Lincecum because of studies showing that pitchers who throw 200 innings in a season early in their careers are more susceptible to injuries.

From April 2 through April 24, Lincecum won his first four decisions of the 2008 season. On May 15, Lincecum struck out 10 Astros in six innings. Houston first baseman Lance Berkman offered his view of Lincecum: "He has three almost unhittable pitches...When he throws those off-speed pitches where he wants, you've got no chance." After his team fell to Lincecum and the Giants 6–3 on May 27, Diamondbacks first baseman Conor Jackson gave his impression of facing Lincecum: "From what I saw tonight, that's the best arm I've seen all year, no doubt. You've got to almost hit a ball right down the middle. Even the ones down the middle are coming at 98. He's good, man."

Lincecum was on the cover of the July 7, 2008, issue of Sports Illustrated. He was selected his first All-Star Game, but he was unavailable to play in it because he was hospitalized the day of the game due to flu-like symptoms. In a July 26 game against the Diamondbacks, he struck out 13 batters in seven innings while allowing seven hits, two earned runs, and no walks.

On September 13, Lincecum pitched his first major league shutout against the San Diego Padres. In nine innings, he threw 138 pitches, gave up four hits and struck out 12 batters. Facing the Rockies on September 23, he recorded his 252nd strikeout of the season, breaking Jason Schmidt's 2004 single-season strikeout record. Lincecum finished the season with 265 strikeouts, making him the first San Francisco pitcher to win the National League (NL) strikeout title and the first Giant to do so since Bill Voiselle in 1944. Lincecum won 18 games, losing just five. On November 11, 2008, Lincecum was awarded the NL Cy Young Award, making him the second Giant (after Mike McCormick in 1967) to win the award. He finished 23rd in that year's NL Most Valuable Player (MVP) Award voting.

After losing his first decision of 2009 on April 12 against the Padres, Lincecum won six in a row, not losing again until June 17. On June 2 at Nationals Park, Lincecum became the quickest Giants' pitcher to reach 500 strikeouts against the Washington Nationals' Cristian Guzmán. In his six June starts, he went 4–1 with a 1.38 ERA and pitched three complete games. On July 3, Lincecum was announced as the NL Pitcher of the Month for June. He and fellow Giants starter Matt Cain were selected to the NL All-Star Team. Lincecum started the game for the NL, allowing two runs (one earned) in two innings pitched in the NL's eventual 4–3 loss.

Through 20 starts in 2009, Lincecum had amassed an 11–3 record with a 2.30 ERA, 183 strikeouts, four complete games, and two shutouts. Lincecum also had a scoreless inning streak of 29 innings, the third-longest streak since the Giants moved to San Francisco from New York City prior to the 1958 season. On July 27, in a 4–2 win over the Pittsburgh Pirates at AT&T Park, Lincecum pitched a complete game and struck out a career-high 15 batters, the second most in San Francisco history (Schmidt struck out 16 in a 2006 game). On August 3, Lincecum was named the NL Player of the Week.

Against the Padres on September 8, Lincecum missed his first regularly scheduled start in his major league career, due to back spasms. Lincecum finished the 2009 season with a 15–7 record, 2.48 ERA and 261 strikeouts. Following the season, Lincecum was named the Sporting News NL Pitcher of the Year for the second consecutive year. On November 19, Lincecum was awarded his second consecutive Cy Young Award, narrowly edging out St. Louis Cardinals pitchers Chris Carpenter and Adam Wainwright. In doing so, he became the first pitcher in MLB history to be awarded the Cy Young in each of his first two full seasons. He finished 18th in NL MVP voting.

First World Series championship (2010)
Lincecum started the 2010 season with a 5–0 record, recording 10 or more strikeouts in three of his first six games. However, from May 15 through May 31, he walked five batters in four consecutive starts. In June, he stopped walking so many hitters, striking out 10 hitters again on June 16 in a 6–3 win over the Baltimore Orioles.

For the third year in a row, Lincecum was selected to the NL All-Star Team. As of the All-Star break, Lincecum was 9–4 with a 3.16 ERA over  innings pitched.  During the season's first half, he defeated Houston's Roy Oswalt three times in three months. All three games were pitchers' duels.

After a disappointing August in which he experienced a five-game losing streak, Lincecum had a strong outing on September 1. Facing one of the league's top pitchers, Ubaldo Jiménez, Lincecum pitched eight innings of one-run ball for his first win since July 30. He won five games in September, finishing the month 5–1. For the third year in a row, Lincecum won the NL strikeout title; he also set a record for most strikeouts by an MLB pitcher in his first four seasons. Lincecum finished the 2010 regular season with a 16–10 record, a 3.43 ERA and 231 strikeouts.

On October 7, in Game 1 of the NL Division Series (NLDS), Lincecum pitched a complete-game two-hit shutout to defeat the Atlanta Braves in his first career postseason game. In his next postseason start, Lincecum outdueled fellow Cy Young Award winner Roy Halladay in a 4–3 victory over the Phillies in Game 1 of the NL Championship Series (NLCS). The two squared off again in Game 5 on October 21, in which Lincecum gave up three runs (two earned) over seven innings but suffered the loss in the 4–2 defeat. In Game 6 on October 23, with the Giants clinging to a one-run lead, Lincecum was summoned from the bullpen on one day's rest to pitch the bottom of the eighth inning. He struck out Jayson Werth before surrendering singles to the next two batters. Brian Wilson stranded the runners to end the eighth, and the Giants won the game 3–2, advancing to the World Series.

In Game 1 of the series against the Texas Rangers, Lincecum committed what he called a "brain fart" in the first inning. With runners at first and third and one out, Lincecum caught Michael Young in a rundown between third base and home. However, instead of throwing towards Pablo Sandoval as he pursued Young to the bag, Lincecum kept the ball himself, allowing Young to scamper back safely. A double play helped him end the inning with only one run scoring, and though he ran into trouble in the next inning, Texas only managed to score one more run. The Giants tied the game in the third, then added six runs in the sixth, taking an 8–2 lead before Lincecum allowed two more runs in the sixth and departed. He earned the win in an eventual 11-7 triumph. With the Giants leading the series three games to one on November 1, Lincecum started Game 5. He recorded 10 strikeouts in eight innings while giving up only three hits en route to a 3–1 victory. The win ended the Giants' 56-year drought between World Series championships and also gave San Francisco its first baseball world championship.

Setting records and Second World Series championship (2011–2012)
On May 4, Lincecum struck out twelve New York Mets, becoming the Giants franchise record holder for most games pitched with 10 or more strikeouts. Lincecum's total of 29 such games surpassed Hall of Fame "first five" inaugural member Christy Mathewson. While Mathewson accumulated his 28 ten-plus-strikeout games in 551 starts over 17 seasons with the Giants, Lincecum recorded 29 such games in 129 starts over five seasons. On May 21, he threw a three-hit shutout against the Oakland Athletics as San Francisco won 3–0. He recorded his 1,000th career strikeout on June 6, against Jerry Hairston Jr. of the Nationals.

Despite having the fourth-lowest ERA in the NL (2.74), including a second-half ERA of 2.31, Lincecum finished the 2011 season with a 13-14 record. Lincecum's so-so win–loss record was largely due to his receiving the worst run support in the major leagues; the Giants scored no runs in ten of his outings and scored two runs or fewer in 21 of them, making Lincecum one of only six pitchers in modern major league history to have at least 200 strikeouts, an ERA of less than 2.75, and a losing record.

Lincecum reportedly rejected San Francisco's offer of a five-year, $100 million extension before the 2012 season. In January 2012, he instead signed a two-year, $40.5 million deal with the Giants, leaving him eligible for free agency after the 2013 season.

Lincecum's career began a downturn in 2012. After winning back-to-back games on April 23 (against the Mets) and 28 (against the Padres), he lost six decisions in a row, not winning again until he threw seven shutout innings against the Los Angeles Dodgers on June 22. At the All-Star break, he had a 3–10 record and a 6.42 ERA.

However, Lincecum improved in the second half of the season, winning seven of his last 12 decisions and posting a 3.83 ERA. In his first game after the All-Star break, he pitched eight shutout innings and struck out 11. Closer Santiago Casilla gave up two runs in the 9th inning, but the Giants won 3-2.  He finished the season with a 10–15 record and 190 strikeouts. The 190 strikeouts were 10th-best in the NL, but Lincecum also led the league in losses (15) and wild pitches (17; highest total in MLB). His 5.18 ERA for the season was nearly double what it had been the year before.

With the Giants only needing four starters for the playoffs, Lincecum was used as a relief pitcher in the postseason. In Game 2 of the NLDS against the Cincinnati Reds, Lincecum threw two shutout innings, though the Giants would lose 9–0.  He picked up the win in Game 4 of the NLDS, throwing  innings of relief and allowing just one run as the Giants won 8–3 to force a deciding Game 5, which they would also win. After Lincecum pitched two hitless innings in Game 1 of the NLCS against the Cardinals, Bochy decided to give him the start in Game 4. Lincecum gave up four runs in  innings, taking the loss in San Francisco's 8–3 defeat. That loss put the Giants down three games to one in the series, but they won the next three games, advancing to the World Series for the second time in three years. In Game 1 of the World Series, Lincecum relieved Barry Zito with two outs in the sixth inning, getting the last out and throwing two further scoreless innings as the Giants defeated the Detroit Tigers by a score of 8–3. Lincecum relieved Ryan Vogelsong with two outs in the sixth inning of Game 3, again throwing  scoreless innings, this time in a 2–0 victory.  The Giants swept the Series for their second title in three seasons.

No-hitters and Third World Series championship (2013–2015)
During the 2012 offseason, Lincecum used a conditioning program to improve his coordination. His performance in spring training in 2013 was lackluster, as he posted a 10.57 ERA. Cain and Madison Bumgarner were both ahead of him in the rotation to start the season. On July 13, Lincecum no-hit the Padres 9–0 at Petco Park, the first no-hitter ever pitched in that stadium and the first of his career. He struck out 13 batters and walked four while throwing a career-high 148 pitches. Lincecum finished the first half of his season with a losing record (5–9), but his 4.26 ERA was lower than what it had been in the first half of 2012 (6.42).

Lincecum pitched to an ERA of 4.54 in the second half of the 2013 season; however, the Giants bullpen accounted for an unusually high 12 earned runs charged to Lincecum. In 32 starts in 2013, Lincecum went 10–14 with a 4.37 ERA, striking out 193 in  innings. By the end of the year, he had 1,510 strikeouts, the third-highest total by a pitcher over his first seven years (behind Tom Seaver's 1,655 and Bert Blyleven's 1,546). On October 22, Lincecum signed a two-year, $35 million contract, which prevented him from becoming a free agent.

With Tim Hudson joining the Giants in 2014, Lincecum fell to fourth in the Giants rotation to start the year. On May 12, Lincecum struck out 11 in  one-run innings as the Giants defeated the Braves 4–2. He had a no-hitter going against the Cubs on May 28 but was removed after five innings, partly because a blister was forming on his middle finger. The no-hitter lasted until the seventh, when John Baker recorded a hit against Jeremy Affeldt, but the Giants still won 5–0. On June 25, Lincecum pitched his tenth career complete game and second career no-hitter. It was his second against the Padres and the third no-hitter in the short history of AT&T Park. With his second no-hit performance against the Padres, Lincecum became the second player in MLB history to throw two no-hitters against the same team (joining Hall of Famer Addie Joss) and the first in Major League history to do it in back-to-back seasons. Against the Phillies on July 22, Lincecum inherited runners at second base and third base with only one out in the 14th inning of a game the Giants led 9–5 over the Phillies. Only the runner at third scored, as Lincecum recorded the final two outs. With the save, Lincecum became the fifth pitcher since 1976 to pitch a no-hitter and record a save in the same season, joining Matt Garza, Chris Bosio, Jerry Reuss, and John Candelaria.

After posting a 9.49 ERA in six games from July 25 through August 23, Lincecum was replaced in the Giants rotation by Yusmeiro Petit. Bochy initially indicated that the move might only be for one start, but Lincecum would spend the rest of the season in the bullpen. On September 25, Lincecum threw two pitches, retiring Alexi Amarista to end the seventh inning, then became the pitcher of record as the Giants took the lead in the bottom of the inning. He won his 100th career game in a 9–8 victory over the Padres at AT&T Park. In 33 games (but only 26 starts), he had a 12–9 record, a 4.74 ERA, and 134 strikeouts in  innings pitched.

Lincecum was the only player on the Giants' 25-man roster who was not used during the NLDS and the NLCS. He finally made an appearance in Game 2 of the 2014 World Series against the Kansas City Royals, entering to start the bottom of the seventh inning and retiring all five batters he faced. Lincecum left the game in the eighth inning with lower back tightness. He did not pitch again in the series, but the Giants defeated the Royals in seven games, giving Lincecum the third World Series championship of his career.

Through May 3, 2015, Lincecum posted a 2–2 record, a 2.40 ERA, 20 strikeouts, and 11 walks in 30 innings pitched. He threw eight shutout innings in a victory over the Los Angeles Angels on May 3, then struck out eight over six shutout innings in a win over the Miami Marlins on May 8. On May 20, in a 4–0 win over the Dodgers, Lincecum pitched seven shutout innings and passed Hall of Famer Carl Hubbell for fourth place in franchise history on the Giants all-time career strikeouts list. On June 27, Lincecum was hit in his pitching elbow with a line drive off the bat of DJ LeMahieu and left the game with an injury. He was diagnosed with a degenerative condition in both hips in July and was given cortisone shots. Still not having pitched since June 27, Lincecum underwent season-ending hip surgery on September 3. For the season, he was 7–4 with a 4.13 ERA and 60 strikeouts. He became a free agent after the season.

Los Angeles Angels (2016)

On May 20, 2016, Lincecum signed a one-year, $2.5 million contract with the Los Angeles Angels. He was optioned to the Triple-A Salt Lake Bees of the PCL on May 22 for a rehab assignment. On June 18, after being called up to start in Oakland, Lincecum gave up one run in six innings to earn a victory in his Angels debut. However, he would only win one more game for the Angels all season, allowing five runs (three earned) in five innings on July 19 in an 8–6 victory over the Rangers. Facing the Seattle Mariners on August 5, he allowed nine hits and six runs in  innings, taking the loss in the 6–4 defeat. The Angels designated Lincecum for assignment the next day, and he accepted an option to Salt Lake on August 9. In September, even though major league rosters expanded from 25 to 40 players, the Angels decided not to recall Lincecum. He finished his major league season with a 2–6 record and a 9.16 ERA, allowing 68 hits and 23 walks over  innings pitched. With the Bees, he had an 0–3 record and a 3.76 ERA in seven starts. He became a free agent after the season.

Texas Rangers
After sitting out the 2017 season, Lincecum signed a one-year contract with the Texas Rangers on March 7, 2018. Rangers' general manager Jon Daniels said the team planned to use him as a relief pitcher. Lincecum began the season on the 60-day disabled list after suffering a blister on his right middle finger during spring training. Eventually, he made 10 appearances for the Round Rock Express of the PCL, posting a 5.68 ERA and walking nine batters in  innings. He was released by the Rangers on June 5, 2018.

In September 2019, Lincecum appeared at a postgame ceremony held by the Giants to mark Bochy's final game as the team's manager. In an interview at the ceremony, Lincecum acknowledged that he had not formally retired from baseball and was "trying to transition". He added, "I think the hardest part was coming to grips with who I was after baseball, and I haven't even done it fully yet".

Pitching style
When pitching, Lincecum would start with his back slightly to the plate, his left leg raised, and his glove held over his head. Then, he would take a step of about seven feet forward, maneuvering his hips over the place his left foot was now planted as he released the ball. This helped him to generate high velocity despite his slight build. The power behind the throws was generated not just from the arm, but also from the long stride and the hip muscles. Sportswriters Bob Nightengale and Robert Falkoff both thought that Lincecum was a similar pitcher to Roy Oswalt.

Lincecum threw a four-seam fastball, but mostly used a two-seam fastball which he threw for more sinking movement to get more ground balls. This pitch had little lateral movement due to his overhand delivery and the speed at which the pitch was thrown. He had a curveball which broke away from right-handed hitters. These were his primary pitches when he first reached the major leagues, but as his career progressed, he added two more. In 2007, he added a changeup with a grip similar to that of a split-finger fastball. A fast pitch, his changeup appeared similar to his fastball for the first , but then dove down sharply and tailed away from left-handed batters. The changeup was his favorite pitch to throw with two strikes. He had thrown a slider in college, and he started using it again in 2008, throwing it far more often by 2011. The slider was a pitch he used when ahead in the count, as he preferred to rely on his fastball when he was behind. His other pitches were typically in the high-70/low-80 mph range (approximately 128.75 km/h); these also slowed slightly as his career progressed.

Career highlights

Awards
{| class="wikitable sortable" 
|-
!style="background:#ccf;"|Award / Honor
!style="background:#ccf;"|Time(s)
!style="background:#ccf;"|Date(s)
|-
|World Series Champion
|3
|, 
|-
|Babe Ruth Award
|1
|
|-
|NL Champion
|3
|2010, 2012, 2014
|-
|NL Cy Young Award
|2
|–
|-
|[[Sporting News Pitcher of the Year Award|The Sporting News''' NL Pitcher of the Year Award]]
|2
|–
|-
|NL strikeouts leader
|3
|–
|-
|NL shutouts leader
|1
|
|-
|NL All-Star
|4
|2008, 2009, 2010, 2011
|-
|MLB All-Star Game NL Starting Pitcher
|1
|2009
|-
|NL Pitcher of the Month
|1
|June 
|-
|NL Player of the Week
|3
|, –
|-
|Major League Baseball Starter of the Year
|1
|
|-
|Players Choice Award for NL's Outstanding Pitcher
|1
|
|-
|San Francisco Giants Opening Day starting pitcher
|4
|–
|-
|Major League Baseball 2K9 and Major League Baseball 2K9 Fantasy All-Stars Cover Athlete
|1
|
|-
|Golden Spikes Award
|1
|2006
|-
|Collegiate Baseball Newspaper National Freshman of the Year
|1
|2004
|-
|Pac-10 Pitcher of the Year
|2
|2004, 2006
|-
|Pac-10 Freshman of the Year
|1
|2004
|-
|Pac-10 Pitcher Of The Week
|1
|2005
|-
|Gatorade Washington State Baseball Player of the Year
|1
|2003
|}

Lincecum was included on the ballot for the National Baseball Hall of Fame class of  when it was announced on November 22, 2021.

Records
 No-hit repeat against the same franchise/team (San Diego Padres) in back-to-back seasons. (–)
 No-hit repeat against the same franchise/team (tied with Addie Joss).
 Multiple no-hitters thrown, multiple Cy Young Awards won, multiple All-Star selections (shared with Sandy Koufax, Randy Johnson, and Roy Halladay).
 Multiple no-hitters thrown, multiple Cy Young Awards won, multiple All-Star selections, multiple World Series championship titles (shared with Sandy Koufax and Justin Verlander).

Personal life
While he was with the Giants, Lincecum lived in the Mission District area of San Francisco, steps away from the old Seals Stadium site. During the off-season, he lived in Seattle. He has owned property in Paradise Valley, Arizona. He has a French bulldog named Cy.

In 2014, the Sacramento Bee described Lincecum as the most beloved San Francisco sports figure since Joe Montana. Because of his "small size and unorthodox pitching delivery, he is an unlikely figure to have reached the pinnacle of his sport", which the Bee'' believes reflects the success of the Giants. Fox Sports in 2014 called him a "local legend and crowd favorite, now and forever." Lincecum was nicknamed "The Freak" by his University of Washington teammates because of his athletic abilities and his ability to generate powerful pitches from his athletic but slight physique. Giants fans continued to refer to him by the moniker during his time with the team.

He was cited for marijuana possession that November.

Lincecum appeared in a 2010 This is SportsCenter commercial. In it, he attempted to record a voicemail greeting on his phone, telling callers that they had reached "The Freak", "The Franchise", "The Freaky Franchise", and "Big Time Timmy Jim," respectively. He was dissatisfied with each attempt, particularly the last because "No one calls me that." Finally, he decided to record one beginning simply "This is Tim Lincecum" – only to be interrupted by Karl Ravech walking by and saying "Hey, Big Time Timmy Jim!" 

Lincecum's brother, Sean, died unexpectedly in 2018 at age 37.  To honor his late brother, Lincecum announced plans to wear No. 44 — Sean's number — in his comeback attempt with the Rangers.

Lincecum's wife, Cristin Coleman, was a school teacher and principal. She died of cancer in June 2022 at age 38.

See also

 List of World Series champions
 List of World Series starting pitchers
 List of Major League Baseball annual strikeout leaders
 List of Major League Baseball annual shutout leaders
 List of Major League Baseball no-hitters
 List of San Francisco Giants Opening Day starting pitchers
 List of San Francisco Giants no-hitters
 List of San Francisco Giants seasons
 List of San Francisco Giants team records

Notes

References

Bibliography

External links

1984 births
American baseball players of Filipino descent
Baseball players from Washington (state)
Cy Young Award winners
Fresno Grizzlies players
Golden Spikes Award winners
Living people
Los Angeles Angels players
Major League Baseball pitchers
National League All-Stars
National League strikeout champions
People from Issaquah, Washington
People from Sausalito, California
Round Rock Express players
Salem-Keizer Volcanoes players
Salt Lake Bees players
San Francisco Giants players
San Jose Giants players
Sportspeople from Bellevue, Washington
Sportspeople from Renton, Washington
Washington Huskies baseball players
Harwich Mariners players